Henri Hyacinthe Helle (4 September 1873 in Thiescourt – 21 June 1901 in Thiescourt) competed for France at the 1900 Summer Olympics, in archery. Helle competed in two events, taking second place in the 50 metre Au Chapelet event and fourth place in the 50 metre Au Cordon Doré competition. His score of 27 points in the Au Cordon Doré was one point behind the third-place archer, Émile Fisseux.  No scores are known for the Au Chapelet competition.

See also
 Archery at the 1900 Summer Olympics

Notes
  - Prizes at the time were silver medals for first place and bronze medals for second, as well as usually including cash awards.  The current gold, silver, bronze medal system was initiated at the 1904 Summer Olympics.  The International Olympic Committee has retroactively assigned medals in the current system to top three placers at early Olympics.

References

External links
 
 

French male archers
Archers at the 1900 Summer Olympics
Olympic archers of France
Olympic silver medalists for France
1873 births
1901 deaths
Olympic medalists in archery
Medalists at the 1900 Summer Olympics
Sportspeople from Oise